The Communist Party of Iceland was a political party in Iceland from 1930 to 1938.

History 
In the early 1920s a group of young militants of the Social Democratic Party (Alþýðuflokkur) came into contact with the international communist movement. Their ideology, and that of their party leader, was quickly growing apart. The communists formed a radical section within the party which they called the "Association of Young Communists" (Félag ungra kommúnista) in November 1922. The group evolved into the "Sparta Social Democratic Association" (Jafnaðarmannafélagið Sparta) in 1926, but they eventually left the social democrats to form their own party as suggested by Comintern in 1928. The Communist Party of Iceland (KFI) was formed in November 1930 and became a member of Comintern. KFI published Verkalýðsblaðið.

In 1938 another splinter group, which had left the social democrats the year before, unified itself with the communists forming the Popular Unity Party - Socialist Party (Sameiningarflokkur alþýðu - Sósíalistaflokkurinn). The new party did not continue the Comintern membership. However, the communists were dominant in the party and it was mostly the same as its predecessor. In 1956 the Socialist Party formed the People's Alliance as an electoral alliance with yet another splinter group from the Social Democratic Party. The People's Alliance became a political party in 1968.

Election results

Sources 
Arnór Hannibalsson: Moskvulínan. Reykjavík 1999: Nýja bókafélagið.
Einar Olgeirsson: Kraftaverk einnar kynslóðar. Jón Guðnason skráði. Reykjavík 1983: Mál og menning.
Hannes Hólmsteinn Gissurarson: Íslenskir kommúnistar 1918–1998. Reykjavík 2011: Almenna bókafélagið.
Jón Ólafsson: Kæru félagar. Reykjavík 1999: Mál og menning.
Þór Whitehead: Sovét-Ísland. Óskalandið. Reykjavík 2010: Ugla.
Hannes H. Gissurarson: Communism in Iceland, 1918–1998 Social Science Research Institute at the University of Iceland, Reykjavik 2021.

External links
English Extract of H. H. Gissurarson’s book

Defunct political parties in Iceland
Iceland
Communist parties in Iceland
Defunct communist parties
1930 establishments in Iceland
Political parties established in 1930
1938 disestablishments in Iceland
Political parties disestablished in 1938